Wendell Horace Moore Jr. (born September 18, 2001) is an American professional basketball player for the Minnesota Timberwolves of the National Basketball Association (NBA). He played college basketball for the Duke Blue Devils.

High school career
Moore attended Cox Mill High School in Concord, North Carolina. As a freshman in 2015–16, he started in all 29 games played and averaged 17.9 points, 8.6 rebounds, 3.3 assists, and 1.8 steals to help his team to a 22–8 record and a sectional championship. As a sophomore in 2016–17, he started in all 33 games and averaged 25.0 points, 9.2 rebounds, 3.9 assists, and 2.3 steals to help his team to a 27–6 record and a 3A state title. As a junior in 2017–18, he became the fastest player to score 1,000 career points in Cabarrus County public school history; averaged 25.4 points, 7.3 rebounds, 2.9 assists, and 2.3 steals to help his team to a 29–3 record and a second straight 3A state title.

Recruiting
On October 8, 2018, Moore announced that he would attend Duke University and play for the Blue Devils during the 2019–20 season. Moore picked the Blue Devils over North Carolina, NC State, South Carolina, and Wake Forest.

College career
Moore scored 17 points in an 81–73 win over Georgetown in the finals of the 2K Classic. He suffered a broken hand in a win against Miami (Florida) on January 4, 2020, which required surgery. After missing six games, Moore returned to action on February 1 in a win against Syracuse. On February 8, Moore scored 17 points and had 10 rebounds in a rivalry game against North Carolina. He hit a putback shot after a Tre Jones miss to give the Blue Devils a 98–96 win. Moore scored a career-high 25 points on February 25, in a 113–101 loss to Wake Forest. He averaged 7.4 points, 4.2 rebounds and 1.9 assists per game as a freshman. As a sophomore, Moore averaged 9.7 points, 4.8 rebounds, 2.7 assists and 1.2 steals per game. He was named to the Second Team All-ACC as a junior, as well as the All-Defensive Team. On November 12, 2021, Moore recorded 19 points, 10 rebounds and 10 assists, making him the fifth player in Blue Devils history with a triple-double. On April 2, 2022, Moore was named the winner of the Julius Erving Award. He declared for the 2022 NBA draft and forgoed his college eligibility on April 21.

Professional career

Minnesota Timberwolves (2022−present)
Moore was selected by the Dallas Mavericks with the 26th overall pick in the 2022 NBA draft, and then traded to the Houston Rockets as part of a trade involving Christian Wood, and then again to the Minnesota Timberwolves in exchange for the 29th overall pick TyTy Washington and two future second-round picks.

National team career
In July 2018, Moore played for the United States in the FIBA Under-17 Basketball World Cup, where his team won the Cup.

Career statistics

College

|-
| style="text-align:left;"| 2019–20
| style="text-align:left;"| Duke
| 25 || 11 || 24.0 || .416 || .211 || .806 || 4.2 || 1.9 || .9 || .2 || 7.4
|-
| style="text-align:left;"| 2020–21
| style="text-align:left;"| Duke
| 24 || 18 || 27.6 || .417 || .301 || .848 || 4.8 || 2.7 || 1.2 || .2 || 9.7
|-
| style="text-align:left;"| 2021–22
| style="text-align:left;"| Duke
| 39 || 39 || 33.9 || .500 || .413 || .805 || 5.3 || 4.4 || 1.4 || .2 || 13.4
|- class="sortbottom"
| style="text-align:center;" colspan="2"| Career
| 88 || 68 || 29.4 || .459 || .358 || .814 || 4.9 || 3.2 || 1.2 || .2 || 10.7

Personal life
His dad played college basketball at Christopher Newport University, and his cousin played college basketball at the Virginia Commonwealth University.

References

External links
Duke Blue Devils bio
USA Basketball bio

2001 births
Living people
American men's basketball players
Basketball players from Charlotte, North Carolina
Basketball players from Richmond, Virginia
Dallas Mavericks draft picks
Duke Blue Devils men's basketball players
Iowa Wolves players
McDonald's High School All-Americans
Minnesota Timberwolves players
Small forwards